Molly Lamont (22 May 1910 – 7 July 2001) was a South African-British film actress.

Life and career

Lamont was born in Boksburg, Transvaal, South Africa. After winning a beauty contest in South Africa she was offered a contract by British International Pictures. She began her career in British films in 1930 and for several years played small, often uncredited roles. Her roles began to improve by the mid-1930s, whilst resident in London, but she later moved to Hollywood where she played roles such as Cary Grant's fiancée in The Awful Truth (1937). Her other appearances include such popular films as The White Cliffs of Dover and Mr. Skeffington (both 1944). Lamont retired from acting in 1951 with more than fifty films to her credit.

She married an airline pilot, Edward Bellande, on April 1, 1937. They remained married until his death in 1976. She died on 7 July 2001 in Brentwood, Los Angeles, aged 91.

Filmography

The Black Hand Gang (1930) (uncredited)
Uneasy Virtue (1931) as Ada
Old Soldiers Never Die (1931) as Ada
The Wife's Family (1931) as Sally
Doctor Josser K.C. (1931) (uncredited)
Strictly Business (1931) as Maureen
What a Night! (1931) as Nora Livingstone
Shadows (1931) as Jill Dexter
The Strangler (1932) as Frances Marsden
The House Opposite (1932) as Doris
Brother Alfred (1932) as Stella
Lucky Girl (1932) as Lady Moira
The Last Coupon (1932) as Betty Carter
Josser on the River (1932) as Julia Kaye
His Wife's Mother (1932) as Cynthia
Lord Camber's Ladies (1932) as Actress
Leave It to Me (1933) as Eve Halliday
Paris Plane (1933)
Letting in the Sunshine (1933) as Lady Anne
White Ensign (1934) as Consul's Daughter
No Escape (1934) as Helen Arnold
Irish Hearts (1934) as Nurse Otway
The Third Clue (1934) as Rosemary Clayton
Murder at Monte Carlo (1935) as Margaret Becker
Handle with Care (1935) as Patricia
Oh, What a Night (1935) as Pat
Rolling Home (1935) as Ann
Jalna (1935) as Pheasant Vaughn Whiteoaks
Alibi Inn (1935) as Mary Talbot
Another Face (1935) as Mary McCall
Muss 'em Up (1936) as Nancy Harding, Paul's Daughter
Mary of Scotland (1936) as Mary Livingstone
Fury and the Woman (1936) as June McCrae
A Woman Rebels (1936) as Young Girl with Sick Baby (uncredited)
The Jungle Princess (1936) as Ava
A Doctor's Diary (1937) as Mrs. Fielding
The Awful Truth (1937) as Barbara Vance
Somewhere I'll Find You (1942) as Nurse Winifred (uncredited)
The Moon and Sixpence (1942) as Mrs. Amy Strickland (uncredited)
A Gentle Gangster (1943) as Ann Hallit
Thumbs Up (1943) as Welfare Supervisor
Follow the Boys (1944) as Miss Hartford (secretary) (uncredited)
The White Cliffs of Dover (1944) as Helen Hampton (uncredited)
Mr. Skeffington (1944) as Miss Norris (uncredited)
Minstrel Man (1944) as Caroline (Mother)
Youth Runs Wild (1944) as Mrs. Webster (uncredited)
Three Sisters of the Moors (1944, Short) as Charlotte Brontë
The Suspect (1944) as Edith Simmons
Devil Bat's Daughter (1946) as Ellen Masters Morris
So Goes My Love (1946) as Cousin Garnet Allison
The Dark Corner (1946) as Lucy Wilding (uncredited)
Scared to Death (1947) as Laura Van Ee
Ivy (1947) as Bella Crail
Christmas Eve (1947) as Harriet Rhodes
South Sea Sinner (1950) as Kay Williams
The First Legion (1951) as Mrs. Nora Gilmartin (final film role)

References

Bibliography

External links

1910 births
2001 deaths
People from Boksburg
English film actresses
South African film actresses
South African emigrants to the United Kingdom
British emigrants to the United States
20th-century English actresses